The following outline is provided as an overview of and topical guide to Bangkok:

Bangkok – capital and most populous city of Thailand. The city occupies 1,568.7 square kilometres (605.7 sq mi) in the Chao Phraya River delta in Central Thailand, and has a population of over 8 million, or 12.6 percent of the country's population.

General reference 
 Pronunciation: 
 Common English name(s): Bangkok
 Official English name(s): City of Bangkok
 Nicknames of Bangkok:
 Adjectival(s): 
 Demonym(s):

Geography of Bangkok 

Geography of Bangkok
 Bangkok is: a city
 Population of Bangkok: 
 Area of Bangkok:  
 Atlas of Bangkok

Location of Bangkok 
 Bangkok is situated within the following regions:
 Northern Hemisphere
 Eastern Hemisphere
 Eurasia
 Asia
 Southeast Asia
 Indochina
 Central Thailand
 Bangkok Metropolitan Region
 Time zone(s): Indochina Time (UTC+7)

Environment of Bangkok 

 Climate of Bangkok

Landforms of Bangkok 

 Chao Phraya River

Areas of Bangkok

Districts of Bangkok 

Districts of Bangkok

Neighborhoods in Bangkok 

 Neighborhoods in Bangkok

Locations in Bangkok

Parks and zoos in Bangkok

Historic locations in Bangkok

Other

Demographics of Bangkok

Government and politics of Bangkok 

 Bangkok Metropolitan Administration

Thailand government within Bangkok 

Bangkok is the capital of Thailand, and its branches of government are located there:
 Government House
 Parliament House
 Administrative Court of Thailand
 Constitutional Court of Thailand
 Supreme Court of Thailand
 Residences of the King of Thailand
 Grand Palace 
 Chitralada Villa

History of Bangkok 

History of Bangkok

History of Bangkok, by period

History of Bangkok, by subject 

 Siege of Bangkok
 Bombing of Bangkok in World War II 
 Bangkok Elevated Road and Train System
 2015 Bangkok bombing

Culture in Bangkok 
Culture of Bangkok
 Architecture of Bangkok
 Museums and art galleries in Bangkok
 List of palaces in Bangkok
 List of tallest buildings in Bangkok
 Museums and art galleries in Bangkok
 Nightlife in Bangkok

Art in Bangkok 
 Theatres in Bangkok

Cinema of Bangkok 
 Bangkok International Film Festival
 World Film Festival of Bangkok

Music of Bangkok 

 Bangkok Jazz Festival

Religion in Bangkok 

 Christianity in Bangkok
 Catholicism in Bangkok
 Roman Catholic Archdiocese of Bangkok

Sports in Bangkok 
Sport in Bangkok
 Basketball in Bangkok
 Bangkok Cobras
 Cricket in Bangkok
 Asian Institute of Technology Ground
 Terdthai Cricket Ground
 Football in Bangkok
 Police Tero F.C.
 Bangkok Glass F.C.
 Bangkok F.C.
 Bangkok United F.C.
 Bangkok United F.C. seasons
 Running in Bangkok
 Bangkok Marathon
 Tennis in Bangkok
 Bangkok Challenger
 Bangkok Challenger II
 Chang-Sat Bangkok 2 Open
 KPN Renewables Bangkok Open
 Sort venues in Bangkok

Economy and infrastructure of Bangkok 

 Banking in Bangkok
 Bangkok Bank
 Commerce in Bangkok
 Markets in Bangkok
 Shopping malls in Bangkok
 Communications in Bangkok
 Postage stamps and postal history of Bangkok 
 Media in Bangkok
 Newspapers in Bangkok
 Bangkok Post
 Tourism in Bangkok
 Television stations in Bangkok

Transportation in Bangkok 
Transport in Bangkok
 Air transport in Bangkok
 Don Mueang International Airport
 Suvarnabhumi Airport
 Bridges in Bangkok
 Bus transit in Bangkok
 Bangkok Mass Transit Authority
 Bus routes in Bangkok
 Rail transit in Bangkok
 Bangkok Railway Station
 Bangkok subway
 Rapid transit stations in Bangkok
 Water transport in Bangkok

Education in Bangkok 

Education in Bangkok

 Schools in Bangkok
 Universities in Bangkok
 Bangkok University
 University of Bangkok

Health in Bangkok 

 Hospitals in Bangkok
 Bangkok Adventist Hospital
 Bangkok Christian Hospital
 Bangkok Hospital
 BNH Hospital
 Bumrungrad International Hospital
 Camillian Hospital
 King Chulalongkorn Memorial Hospital
 Manarom Hospital
 Mayo Hospital (Thailand)
 Nakornthon Hospital
 Phyathai 1 Hospital
 Phyathai 2 International Hospital
 Phyathai 3 Hospital
 Ramathibodi Hospital
 Siriraj Hospital
 Somdet Chaopraya Institute of Psychiatry
 Vajira Hospital
 Vejthani Hospital
 Vibhavadi Hospital
 Yanhee Hospital

See also 
 Outline of geography

References

External links 

Bangkok
 1